G. Owen Bonawit (1891–1971) was an artist whose studio created thousands of pieces of stained glass for Yale, Duke, Northwestern, and Southeast Missouri State universities; Connecticut College; Bethesda By The Sea Episcopal Church in Palm Beach, Florida and at private homes.  There are, by one count, 887 pieces in Yale's Sterling Memorial Library.  Bonawit worked often and closely with the architect James Gamble Rogers. His career peaked around 1930; his last major commission was in 1940.

Works
Duke University Chapel
Deering Library (Northwestern University)
Connecticut College, New London
Kent Library (Southeast Missouri State University)

Yale University
Branford College
Saybrook College
Sterling Memorial Library
Berkeley College
Hall of Graduate Studies

Gallery

References

Further reading

 Walker, Gay. Bonawit, Stained Glass, and Yale: G. Owen Bonawit's Work at Yale University & Elsewhere, Wildwood Press, 2002.
 Walker, Gay. Stained Glass in Yale’s Sterling Memorial Library: A Guide to the Decorative Glass of G. Owen Bonawit, Wildwood Press, 2006.
 Walker, Gay.  "Brilliance All Around", illustrated talk for Yale University Library's 75th Anniversary, 2006.

1891 births
1971 deaths
American stained glass artists and manufacturers